100 Proof is a 1997 independently produced American thriller film written and directed by Jeremy Horton. Shot on location in Kentucky, it is based on the true story of a killing spree that took place in Lexington in 1986. Two women, LaFonda Fay Foster and Tina Hickey Powell, murdered five people in the real-life incident. The film's supporting cast includes Jim Varney, who portrays the drunk, violent, incestuous father of one of the two women at the center of the story. Varney's role is radically different from the humorous Ernest P. Worrell character for which he was best known.

Premise
Close friends Rae and Carla live an impoverished life in a quiet, depressed Southern town. They pay for their drug and alcohol habits through odd jobs, grifting, and occasional prostitution. Rae has a disturbing encounter with her abusive, alcoholic father at a local bar. The two friends then head out to the countryside to score some cocaine and a brutal cycle of violence ensues.

Cast
Pamela Stewart as Rae
Tara Bellando as Carla
Jack Stubblefield Johnson as Arco
Minnie Bates Yancy as Sissy
Larry Brown as Eddie
Kevin Hardesty as Roger
Jim Varney as Rae's Father
Loren Crawford as Trudy
Joe Ventura as Ted
Warren Ray as Tommy
Jeff Lycan as R.T.
Bobby Simmons as Toby
Peter Smith as Fryman
Buck Finley as Chester
Joe Gatton as Owen

Reception
The film premiered at the Sundance Film Festival in January 1997 and was released commercially that September. Variety reviewer Joe Leydon applauded the acting—particularly that of Stewart and Varney—and called the film a "diamond in the rough, or at least a shiny bit of jagged rhinestone." Stephen Holden of The New York Times praised the film's "integrity" and authentic depiction of poverty and violence, but found it difficult to take: "The film's crudeness works in its favor ... [it] has the look, texture and loose-jointedness of a semi-improvised home movie. Nothing is really explained. You are just plunked into the middle of this infinitely sullen slice of life. It isn't long before the characters' boredom and accumulated hostility begin to seep into you. But beyond an appalled sense of pity, it is impossible to feel much for them. You just want to get out of there as quickly as possible."

Ken Fox of TV Guide viewed it as both "grueling" and admirable: "The film attains the dirty, hyperrealism of a reality based cop show, but with a surprising touch of quiet compassion. ... In the end, the violence isn't cleansing, redemptive or empowering; it's just pitiful and very nasty."

Notes

 Credits are per Screen World 1998 (1999) by John Willis and Barry Monush, p. 170. New York: Applause. .

References

External links
 
 
 

1997 films
1997 independent films
1997 thriller films
American independent films
American thriller films
Films set in the United States
Films shot in Kentucky
Thriller films based on actual events
1990s English-language films
1990s American films